Lower Falls may refer to:
Lower Falls, a named section of Yellowstone Falls
Lower Falls (District Electoral Area)
Lower Falls, West Virginia
Lower Falls (Yarmouth, Maine)